Fire is the rapid oxidation of a material in the chemical process of combustion.

Fire also commonly refers to:
Conflagration, a large and destructive fire
Structure fire, a house or building on fire
Wildfire, a fire in a forest, rangeland, or other outdoor location

Fire or Fires may also refer to:

People
 Fire (wrestler) (born 1973)
 Alexis Fire (born 1964), American pornographic actress and prostitute
 Andrew Fire (born 1959), American biologist
 Walshy Fire (born 1982), Jamaican-American DJ

Film and TV

Film

 Fire! (1901 film), British
 The Fire (1916 film), Italian
 Fire! (1977 film), American TV movie
 Fire! (1991 film), Malian
 Fire (1996 film), Indian
 Fire (2002 film), Pakistani
 The Fire (2015 film), Argentine
 Fire (2020 film), Russian

Television
 Fire (Lexx), a planet in the multinational TV series Lexx
 Fire (TV series), a 1995 Australian television series
 "Fire" (The X-Files), a 1993 episode of the American series
 "The Fire" (Seinfeld), a 1994 episode of the American series
 "The Fire" (The Office), a 2005 episode of the American series
 "The Fire" (Under the Dome), a 2013 episode of the American series
 "Fire", a 1984 episode in the American series The A-Team
 "Fire!", an episode of the American series Daria
 Fires (TV series), a 2021 Australian anthology television series

Literature
 Fire!!, a 1926 African American literary magazine
 Fire (2012 novel), by Mats Strandberg and Sara Bergmark Elfgren
 Fire (Cashore novel), 2009
 Fire (magazine), a firearms magazine
 Fire (Rodgers novel), 1990
 Fires (book), 1936, by Marguerite Yourcenar
 The Fire (novel), 2008, by Katherine Neville
 Sourcebooks Fire, an imprint of American publisher Sourcebooks

Comics and manga
 Fire (comics), a DC Comics character
 Fire (Image Comics), a miniseries by Brian Michael Bendis
 Fire! (manga), a shōjo manga series by Hideko Mizuno

General entertainment
 Fire (artscene group), an underground computer-art group in the late 1990s
 Fire (Game & Watch), a 1980 game released by Nintendo
 Fire (musical), a 1985 musical play
 Fire: Ungh's Quest, a 2015 game developed by Daedalic Entertainment
 Fire, the original name for the Pokémon species Moltres

Music

Albums

 Fire (The Bug album), 2021
 The Fire (Matt Cardle album), 2012
 Fire (Electric Six album), 2003
 Fire (Fleurine album), 2005
 The Fire (Heatwave album), 1988
Fire (Markus Feehily album), 2015
 Fires (Ronan Keating album), 2012
 Fire (Ohio Players album), 1974
 Fires (Nerina Pallot album), 2005
 The Fire (Senses Fail album), 2010
 Fire (Mark Simmonds Freeboppers album), 1993
 Fire, the Acoustic Album, by Izzy Stradlin, 2007
 Fire (Wild Orchid album), 2001
 Fire, by Marek Biliński, 2008
Fire! Live at the Village Vanguard, David Newman, 1989

Groups
 Fire (band), a 1960s–1970s English group
 The Fire (band), a 2000s Chilean group

Record labels
 F-IRE Collective, a creative music community in London
 Fire Records (UK), a British independent record label
 Fire Records, an American record label

Songs
 "Fire" (2NE1 song), 2009
 "Fire" a song by Tina Barrett, 2012
 "Fire" (Big Sean song), 2013
 "Fire" (Arthur Brown song), 1968
 "Fire" (BTS song), 2016
 "Fire" (Joe Budden song), 2003
 "Fire" (Ferry Corsten song), 2005
 "Fire" (Barns Courtney song), 2015
 "Fire" (Dead by Sunrise song), 2010
 "Fire" (Beth Ditto song), 2017
 "Fire" (Autumn Hill song), 2013
 "Fire" (The Jimi Hendrix Experience song), 1967
 "Fire" (Kasabian song), 2009
 "Fire" (Lacuna Coil song), 2012
 "Fire" (Leona Lewis song), 2015
 "Fire" (Krystal Meyers song), 2005
 "Fire" (Ohio Players song), 1974
 "Fire" (Prodigy song), 1992
 "Fire" (Shinee song), 2013
 "Fire" (Bruce Springsteen song), 1977, made famous by the Pointer Sisters' 1979 cover.
 "Fire" (U2 song), 1981
 "Fire" (Michelle Williams song), 2013
 "Fire" (Kids See Ghosts song), 2018
 "Fire", by 50 Cent on the 2007 album Curtis
 "Fire", by Alexandra Burke on the 2012 album Heartbreak on Hold
 "Fire", by Ayọ on the 2013 album Ticket to the World
 "Fire", by Black Pumas on the 2019 album Black Pumas
 "Fire", by B-Real on the 2009 album Smoke N Mirrors
 "Fire", by Don Broco on the 2015 album Automatic
 "Fire", by Busta Rhymes on the 2000 album Anarchy
 "Fire", by Jaden Smith on the 2014 album CTV2
 "Fire", by Jason Derulo on the 2013 album Tattoos
 "Fire", by Jessie J on the 2014 album Sweet Talker
 "Fire", by Justice on the 2016 album Woman
 "Fire", by Keyone Starr which represented Mississippi in the American Song Contest
 "Fire", by Krokus on the 1980 album Metal Rendez-vous
 "Fire", by Markus Feehily on the 2015 album Fire
 "Fire!", by Panda Bear on the 1999 album Panda Bear
 "Fire", by Puressence, on the 1996 album Puressence
 "Fire", by PVRIS, on the 2014 album White Noise
 "Fire", by Raghav on the 2012 album The Phoenix
 "Fire", by Scooter on the 1997 album Age of Love
 "Fire", by Jay Sean on the 2009 album All or Nothing
 "Fire", by Soulfly on the 1998 album Soulfly
 "Fire", by Waxahatchee on the 2020 album Saint Cloud
 "Fires", a 2009 single by Band of Skulls
 "The Fire", by Reel Big Fish on the 2005 album We're Not Happy 'til You're Not Happy

Sports
 Birmingham Fire, an American football team
 Queensland Fire, an Australian cricket team
 Rhein Fire (NFL Europe), an American football team in NFL Europe
 Southeastern Fire, the college sports teams of Southeastern University in Florida, US

Technology
 Fire (instant messaging client), a messaging client for Mac OS X
 Fire (OS), an Android-based mobile operating system by Amazon
 Autodesk Fire, a video digital editing system

Other uses
 Fire (classical element), an element in ancient Greek philosophy and science
 Fire (Wu Xing), a philosophical concept
 Fires (military), one of the six warfighting functions
 Foundation for Individual Rights in Education, free speech nonprofit group
Shouting fire in a crowded theater

See also
 FIRE (disambiguation), terms and groups using the initials or acronym
 Fyre (disambiguation)
 Fiers (disambiguation), including a list of people with the surname
 Firer, a surname (including a list of people with the name)
 Firing (disambiguation)
 This Fire (disambiguation)
 
  (more than 5,000)